This is a list of destinations that Tunisair flies to (as of July 2019). This list does not include charter-only destinations.

References

Lists of airline destinations